Hagestad is a surname. Notable people with the surname include:

Gunhild Hagestad (born 1942), Norwegian sociologist 
Stewart Hagestad (born 1991), American amateur golfer